Bipinnula is a genus of flowering plants from the orchid family, Orchidaceae. It is native to South America (Brazil, Argentina, Uruguay, Chile).

Species 
Accepted species as of May 2014:

 Bipinnula biplumata (L.f.) Rchb.f. - Brazil, Argentina, Uruguay
 Bipinnula fimbriata (Poepp.) I.M.Johnst. - Chile
 Bipinnula gibertii Rchb.f. - Uruguay, Rio Grande do Sul
 Bipinnula montana Arechav. - Uruguay, Rio Grande do Sul
 Bipinnula penicillata (Rchb.f.) Cisternas & Salazar  - Brazil, Argentina, Uruguay
 Bipinnula plumosa Lindl.  - Chile
 Bipinnula polysyka Kraenzl. - Argentina, Uruguay
 Bipinnula taltalensis I.M.Johnst. - Antofagasta
 Bipinnula volkmannii Kraenzl.  - Chile

See also 
 List of Orchidaceae genera

References 

 Pridgeon, A.M., Cribb, P.J., Chase, M.A. & Rasmussen, F. eds. (2003). Genera Orchidacearum 3. Oxford Univ. Press
 Berg Pana, H. 2005. Handbuch der Orchideen-Namen. Dictionary of Orchid Names. Dizionario dei nomi delle orchidee. Ulmer, Stuttgart

External links 

Orchids of Brazil
Flora of Uruguay
Orchids of Argentina
Flora of Chile
Orchidoideae genera
Chloraeinae